Series 6 of the ITV programme Foyle's War was first aired in 2010, beginning Sunday 11 April; comprising three episodes, it is set in the period from June to August 1945.

Episodes

"The Russian House"

Cast and characters
Foyle is still chasing retirement after his resignation at the end of "All Clear," but his superiors are finding it hard to find his replacement. He gives them four weeks before he steps down for good. His former WW1 CO, Brigadier Timothy Wilson, arrives from the War Office to enlist his help with the search of a German sympathiser and ethnic Russian POW. Meanwhile, Milner, keen to step out of Foyle's shadow and prove himself as a detective, is now in Brighton with his new wife, Edie, and their recently born daughter, Clementine Elizabeth. Stewart has returned to civilian life and had just started working as a domestic for the well-to-do artist, Sir Leonard Spencer-Jones, before considering another offer from Adam Wainwright to work at a guest house. Also at the house is another anti-communist Russian POW who is now the groundsman and serves as a witness to murder.

Background and production
The major theme of this episode is the emerging effects of the Cold War in post-war Britain, and the commencement of the repatriation of enemy combatants from the UK. For Russian combatants, particularly for enemy sympathisers, anti-communists, and those with knowledge of atrocities, the pending deportation situation was bleak. Part of the plot, therefore, centres on members of the Russian Liberation Movement (aka "White Russians"), who are seeking to avoid repatriation to the USSR. In this context, mention is also made of the Almanzora, a ship used by the British to transport returnees to Odessa, during the repatriation of Cossacks after World War II (and in which ex-troops from the West Indies immigrated to Britain in 1947). The show should not be confused with the 1989 novel, The Russia House, by John le Carré.

"Killing Time"

Cast and characters
Foyle continues his work at the Hastings Police Station, where he opposes a racial segregation order at the town council, and in his spare time, continues his hobby of fly fishing. Foyle is supported by a new assistant detective, DC Hadley; Milner (who is now working in Brighton) does not appear in this episode. Stewart and Wainwright continue their work running and organising the guest house, and slowly they begin to become closer as they help Dean and her baby.

Background and production
The primary theme in the episode is prejudice and segregation imposed by the US Military on its soldiers and in locations visited by soldiers near to its bases (as seen in incidents such as the 1943 Battle of Bamber Bridge in Lancashire and the 1944 Park Street riot in Bristol). Another theme is that of the "conchies", or conscientious objectors, returning to civilian life along with demobilised soldiers. Underlying all of these is the social stigma against unplanned single motherhood and a tension (particularly among US troops of the time) against interracial relationships.

"The Hide"

Cast and characters
After his resignation, Foyle makes plans to go to the US aboard the Queen Mary to "tie up some loose ends" - an oblique reference to his determination to bring Howard Paige to justice, since he was unable to do so in the episode "Fifty Ships". We also learn of Caroline Devereaux's involvement as a nurse in Foyle's recuperation from injuries in WW1. This episode not only sees the final appearance of Anthony Howell as Milner, but also sees the budding relationship between Stewart and Wainwright bloom into an engagement at Hill House.

Background and production
The episode prologues with the firebombing of Dresden in February 1945 and ends by highlighting the role of Queen Mary in repatriating returning US troops. It also introduces MI9, whose primary role was to support available European Resistance networks. The Devereaux estate, referred to as Whitefriars in the episode, is fictional but loosely based on the life of William Devereux. In terms of production, there was a three-year gap before the next series aired in 2013.

International broadcast
Series Six was broadcast in the United States on PBS stations on Masterpiece Mystery! as Foyle's War VI on 2, 9 and 16 May 2010, and on Netflix as of April 2014.

References

External links 
 Series 6 on IMDb

Fiction set in 1945
Foyle's War episodes
2010 British television seasons